South Street Bridge could refer to:
 South Street Bridge (Poultney, Vermont)
 South Street Bridge (Philadelphia, Pennsylvania)